Amiga Unix (informally known as Amix) is a discontinued full port of AT&T Unix System V Release 4 operating system developed by Commodore-Amiga, Inc. in 1990 for the Amiga computer family as an alternative to AmigaOS, which shipped by default.

Overview
Bundled with the Amiga 2500UX and Amiga 3000UX, Commodore's Unix was one of the first ports of SVR4 to the 68k architecture. The Amiga A3000UX model even got the attention of Sun Microsystems, though ultimately nothing came of it.

Unlike Apple's A/UX compatibility layer for System 7 applications, Amiga Unix contains no compatibility layer for AmigaOS applications. With few native applications available to take advantage of the Amiga's significant multimedia capabilities, it failed to find a niche in the competitive Unix workstation market of the early 1990s. Sun, HP, and IBM had similarly priced systems. The A3000UX's 68030 was noticeably underpowered compared to most of its RISC-based competitors.

Unlike typical commercial Unix distributions of the time, Amiga Unix included the source code to the vendor-specific enhancements and platform-dependent device drivers (essentially any part that wasn't owned by AT&T), allowing interested users to study or enhance those parts of the system.  However this source code was subject to the same license terms as the binary part of the system it was not free software.  Amiga Unix also incorporated and depended upon many open source components, such as the GNU C Compiler and X Window System, and included their source code.

Like many other proprietary Unix variants with small market shares, Amiga Unix vanished into the mists of computer history when its vendor, Commodore, went out of business. Today, Unix-like operating systems such as Minix, NetBSD, and Linux are available for the Amiga platform.

See also
 Atari TT030, Unix workstation from Atari

References

External links
 Manual: Commodore, Amiga Unix, System V Release 4, Learning Amiga Unix (11/1990)
 The Very Unofficial Commodore Amiga Unix (AMIX) Wiki
 Video of AMIX running under FS-UAE

Amiga
Discontinued operating systems
UNIX System V